Berry Sakharof (born 7 July 1957) is an Israeli rock guitarist, singer, songwriter and producer. Sakharof is one of Israel's most popular and critically acclaimed rock musicians, and is often referred to as "the prince of Israeli rock".

Biography
Sakharof was born in İzmir, Turkey, in 1957 into a Jewish family. His family immigrated to Israel when he was 3 years old.

Start of career
Sakharof started his musical career at the age of 16 as a member of Cosmic Dream. Another member was his friend, Rami Fortis. Together they performed in rock clubs in Israel.

1980s
Sakharof first came to public attention in the 1980s.

Right after his military service Sakharof flew to Belgium, where he became a founding member of post-punk band Minimal Compact, the first Israeli rock band to achieve significant success outside Israel.  The band recorded six albums, all released on Crammed Discs.

On 24 July 1984, Sakharof was arrested in the Ben Gurion Airport possessing a small quantity of cocaine. He was tried and sentenced to a year in person, of which he served 8 months.

In 1988, Minimal Compact broke up after the members did not get work visas for the United States, where they planned a concert tour. Sakharof and fellow former Minimal Compact guitarist Rami Fortis began an extended period of collaboration, eventually returning to Israel and producing many songs.

1990s
After leaving Fortis, Sakharof continued producing albums. The album Signs of Weakness (Simanim Shel Khulsha), a collaboration with multi-instrumentalist and producer Rea Mochiach, was chosen as the 11th best album ever (and the highest ranking for an Israeli album) by a readers' poll on the popular news site Ynet.

By the mid-1990s, Sakharof's was one of the highest-grossing live acts in Israel, and he was commonly referred to in the media as the "prince of Israeli rock".

Sakharof's biggest commercial success came in 1998 with the release of Touches, the sales of which reached platinum within several days.

2000s
In 2001 his album The Other was released. The album included the song "Lord of World", which was written by Barry Hazak, a soldier who died in the Yom Kippur War and a cover of Ehud Banai's song "City of Refuge". The album's name was taken from the perception of "The Other" of the French philosopher Emmanuel Lévinas, who is also quoted in the album's booklet. "Monsoon", which was written by Micha Shitrit and Berry Sakharof, was the only song from the album broadcast on the radio as a single. In the same year Sakharof wrote soundtracks for two Israeli movies.

In 2002, Sakharof collaborated with Erez Aizen and Amit Duvedevani of Infected Mushroom to create the Birthday EP.

In 2003 he produced the debut album of the band Biluim named the Biluim.

During 2005 his album 11 Alef was released. The album is the result of about two years of mutual work with Rea Mochiach (who moved to the United States after the release of the album Signs of Weakness) during Mochiach's occasional visits to Israel. The album was sold in the first week only on the Internet in the MP3 format and later released to the music stores; due to the release of the album Mochiach arrived in Israel and participated in a short concert tour with Sakharof.

In 2006 Sakharof reunited with Fortis for a new album and a tour.

Recent activity

Sakharof continues to play gigs, mostly in Israel, but also some shows in America and other parts of the world. in 2009 he released Ibn Gabirol, a concept album that has a melancholic tone to it and deals with lyrics written by Solomon ibn Gabirol, one of the greatest Jewish poets of the Middle Ages, a man that died prematurely but left with his poetry a heritage for hundreds of years. the album is not a rock-album but traditional middle-eastern instruments and songwriting comes into play.

2011 Sakharof released another solo album, you are here (Ata Nimtza kan), which again brings the classic Sakharof-style with electric guitars, drum computers, synths, bass and vocals. The lyrics cover a wide range of topics, from the High Holy Days (Yamim haNoraim), over a ghostly town (Lochesch baMchoniot), to relationship problems (Nechama, Zman shel Misparim). The song "Haderekh le Arad" ("The road down to Arad") paints the picture of a dried out desert landscape that is waiting for the fulfillment of the prophecies, when the Jewish people will be visited by their king, who will appear victoriously. "The wolf that will dwell with them is not yet born".

Minimal Compact also played some revival-gigs in late 2011 with Samy Birnbach on vocals and a rare stage presence of Malka Spigel on bass guitar.

Discography

Solo albums
1991 – All or Nothing (Ha'kol O klum)
1993 – Signs of Weakness (Simanim Shel Khulsha)
1995 – Calor en la luna (Kham Al Ha'Yare'akh)
1996 -  Saint Clara (Clara Hakedosha) - soundtrack to the film of the same name
1998 – Touches (Negiot)
2001 – The Other (Ha'akher)
2003 – Live 93-02
2005 – 11 Alef
2009 – Ibn Gavirol, (Those with) Reddened Lips (Ibn Gavirol, Adumey Ha'Sefatot)
2011 – You Are Here (Ata Nimtsa Kan)
2015 – Touches (Negiot) – a limited edition vinyl record
2016 – Gatherings (Likutim)
2017 – She Appeared Like the Wind (Hi Hofi'ah Kmo Haruach)
2021 – A shred of light (Bdal Shel Or)

 With Rea Mochiach 
 2009 – "Red Lips" (Adumey HaSefatot)

With Minimal Compact
1981 – Minimal Compact (EP)
1982 – One by One1984 – Deadly Weapons1984 – Next One Is Real (EP)
1985 – Raging Souls1986 – Immigrants Songs1987 – The Figure One Cuts1988 – Live1988 – Lowlands Flight2004 – Music From Upstairs: Archives & Experiments2004 – Returning WheelWith Fortisakharof
1990 – 1900? (Elef T'sha Meot)
1992 – When the Guitar Saws the Night2006 – On the Watch (Al Ha'Mishmeret)

With Foreign Affair
1989 – East on Fire1990 – Sandanya (EP)

As producer and contributor
1988 Rami Fortis – Tales from the Box (Sipurim Me'hakufsa)
1998 Micha Shitrtit – Masmerim Ve'notzot
(with Izhar Ashdot)
2003 Ha'Biluim – Ha'Biluim''

References

External links

 
UnOfficial archive 

1957 births
Living people
Turkish Sephardi Jews
Turkish emigrants to Israel
20th-century Israeli male singers
Israeli film score composers
Israeli record producers
Israeli rock guitarists
Israeli pop singers
Male film score composers
Israeli music arrangers
21st-century Israeli male singers
Israeli Sephardi Jews
Israeli Mizrahi Jews